Pfefer is a surname. Notable people with the surname include:

Jack Pfefer (1894–1974), Russian-born American wrestling promoter
Mojżesz Pfefer (1856–1919), Polish industrialist, landowner, philanthropist, and social activist

See also
Pfeffer